João Fernandes is a Grand Prix motorcycle racer from Portugal.

Career statistics

By season

 World Endurance Championship:
2007 - Champion SuperProduction Class - 5th Overall
2007 - Le Mans 24H - 5th SuperProduction Class - 15th Overall
2007 - 6H Albacete - Winner SuperProduction Class - 8th Overall
2007 - 24H Orschesleben - 3rd SuperProduction Class - 10th Overall
2007 - 8H Suzuka - Winner SuperProduction Class - 14th Overall
2007 - 8H Qatar - 3rd SuperProduction Class - 9th Overall

 Macau Grand Prix (Highlights):
2009 - 3rd - Supersport 600cc
2008 - 3rd - Supersport 600cc
2007 - 4th - Supersport 600cc
2005 - 4th - Supersport 600cc
2003 - 5th - Supersport 600cc

 National Portuguese Championship
1998 - Champion - Honda CBR600 Trophy
1999 - 5th - Supersport 600cc
2000 - 6th - Supersport 600cc
2001 - Vice-Champion - Honda CBR600 Trophy 
2002 - 6th - SuperStock 1000cc

 National China Championship:
2005 - Champion - Superbikes 1000cc
2006 - Champion - SuperSport 600cc
2008 - Champion - SuperSport 600cc
2009 - 3rd - Superbikes 1000cc
2010 - 2nd - Superbikes 1000cc

References

External links
 Profile on motogp.com

1977 births
Living people
Portuguese motorcycle racers
250cc World Championship riders
Sportspeople from Lisbon